Antonio Gandini (1565 – 17 July 1630) was an Italian painter of the late-Renaissance period. He was a pupil of the painter Paolo Veronese. In Brescia, his pupils were Ottavio Amigoni, Francesco Barbieri (il Legnano), and Ambrogio Besozzi. He worked alongside Giacomo Barucco. Gandini's son, Bernardino (died 1651), was also a painter.

References

 Getty ULAN

1565 births
1630 deaths
16th-century Italian painters
Italian male painters
17th-century Italian painters
Painters from Brescia
Renaissance painters